Erik Thomas Sullivan (born August 9, 1972) is an American volleyball player. He played for the United States national team at the 2000 and 2004 Summer Olympics.

References

1972 births
Living people
Olympic volleyball players of the United States
Volleyball players at the 2000 Summer Olympics
Volleyball players at the 2004 Summer Olympics
Sportspeople from California
People from Encinitas, California
American men's volleyball players
Volleyball players at the 2003 Pan American Games
Pan American Games competitors for the United States
Texas Longhorns women's volleyball coaches
Nebraska Cornhuskers women's volleyball coaches
UCLA Bruins men's volleyball players